Computer Games is the debut album by American funk musician George Clinton, released by Capitol Records on November 5, 1982. Though technically Clinton's first "solo" album, the record featured most of the same personnel who had appeared on recent albums by Parliament and Funkadelic, both formally disbanded by Clinton in 1981. Conceived in the aftermath of a period marked by financial and personal struggles for Clinton, "Computer Games" restored his popularity for a short time before P-Funk fell victim to renewed legal problems and scant label support in the mid 1980s.

According to Glenn Kenny of Trouser Press, after the end of his Parliament-Funkadelic collective, Clinton's album was titled as a "nod to the burgeoning wave of techno-funk that was beginning to overtake almost every other form of dance music; rather than reject the new technology, he adapted it here in his own unique way".

The single "Loopzilla" hit the Top 20 R&B charts, followed by "Atomic Dog" which reached No. 1 R&B but peaked at #101 on the pop chart.

The album was listed by Slant Magazine at #97 on its list of "Best Albums of the 1980s."

Track listing
 "Get Dressed" (George Clinton, Bootsy Collins) – 3:41 (released as a single-Capitol 5222)
 "Man's Best Friend/Loopzilla" (Clinton, Kenneth Gambrell, Garry Shider, David Spradley) – 12:51 (released as a 12" single-Capitol 8556)
 "Pot Sharing Tots" (Clinton, Walter Morrison) – 3:45
 "Computer Games" (Clinton, Morrison) – 6:46
 "Atomic Dog" (Clinton, Shider, Spradley) – 4:47 (released as a single-Capitol 5201 and 12" single-Capitol 8556)
 "Free Alterations" (Darryl Clinton, Clinton) – 4:20
 "One Fun at a Time" (Clinton, Morrison) – 4:29

Personnel
George Clinton
Eddie Hazel, Garry Shider, Junie Morrison, Tony Thomas - guitar
Bootsy Collins, Junie Morrison - bass
Bernie Worrell, David Spradley, Junie Morrison, Rahni Harris - keyboards
Dennis Chambers, Jerry Jones - drums
Larry Fratangelo, Muruga Booker - percussion
Fred Wesley, Larry Hatcher, Maceo Parker, Richard Griffith - horns
Bootsy Collins, Brenda Forman, Brides of Funkenstein, Carmen McGee, Clip Payne, Darryl Clinton, Garry Shider, Gary Mudbone Cooper, George Bunny, Godmoma, Gwendolyn Dozier, Jessica Cleaves, Jessie Driscoll, Jimmy Keaton, Joyce Pearson, Julius Keaton, Junie Morrison, Larry Heckstall, Parlet, Ray Davis, Robert "P-Nut" Johnson, Ron Ford, Tracey Lewis, Trina Frazier, Vanessa Poe, Veronica Faust - vocals
Technical
David Baker, Mike Iacopelli, John Jaszcz, Tony Ray, Greg Reilly, Jeff Turkin, Jim Vitti, Greg Ward – recording engineer
George Clinton, William Collins, Ted Currier, Walter "Junie" Morrison, Gary Shider – Producer
George Clinton, Junie Morrison, Fred Wesley – arrangements
Greg Reilly, Jim Vitti – mixing

Charts

Weekly charts

Year-end charts

Notes

References

External links
 Computer Games at Discogs

George Clinton (funk musician) albums
1982 debut albums
Capitol Records albums
Albums with cover art by Pedro Bell